|

The 20th Virginia Infantry Regiment was an infantry regiment raised in Virginia for service in the Confederate States Army during the American Civil War. It fought mostly with the Army of Northern Virginia.

The 20th Virginia was assembled in July, 1861, with men from Richmond and the counties of Lunenburg, Powhatan, Buckingham, Prince Edward, Halifax, and Brunswick. The college unit The "Hampden-Sydney Boys" served from that institution. Two companies were captured in the fight at Rich Mountain and in September five companies were disbanded.

An unsuccessful attempt was made to reorganize, and later the two companies were assigned to the 59th Virginia Infantry.

Lieutenant Colonels James R. Crenshaw, John Pegram, and Nathaniel Tyler were in command.

In popular culture
In the science fiction short story, Field Test by Keith Laumer, a newly designed and built Bolo Mark XX Model B is assigned to "the 20th Virginia, a regiment ancient and honorable, with a history dating back to Terra Insula".

See also

List of Virginia Civil War units

References

{{| author=G.L. Sherwood  | publisher=The Virginia Regimental Histories Series | =year 1994 }}
Units and formations of the Confederate States Army from Virginia
1861 establishments in Virginia
Military units and formations established in 1861
1865 disestablishments in Virginia
Military units and formations disestablished in 1865